Ishanavarman II was an Angkorian king who is believed to have ruled from 923 to 928. His empire may have been confined to Angkor and the area around Battambang to the west.

Family 
Ishanavarman was a son of King Yasovarman and his wife, who was a sister of Jayavarman IV.

Grandparents of Ishanavarman were Indravarman I and his wife Indradevi.

Ishanavarman had an elder brother, Harshavarman I.

Biography 
Ishanavarman succeeded his dead brother in 923. The period of his reign may have been very tumultuous and chaotic.

In 921, his uncle, Jayavarman IV, had already set up a rival city about 100 km north-east of Angkor. 

During Ishanavarman’s reign, a temple called Prasat Kravan was built.

Nothing else is known about Ishanavarman II. He died in 928 and received a posthumous name of Paramarudraloka.

References

10th-century Cambodian monarchs
Khmer Empire
Year of birth unknown
928 deaths